West Swan Road is a road in the Swan Valley wine region in the northeastern suburbs of Perth, Western Australia. Starting in the centre of Guildford, it provides access to the wineries of the region and to The Vines golf resort.

It was gazetted in 1979 and was known as road numbers 4288 and 1116 in plans and maps.

See also

References

Roads in Perth, Western Australia
Articles containing video clips